John Timothy Ledgerwood (May 4, 1879 – November 19, 1976) was an American politician in the state of Washington. He served in the Washington House of Representatives.

References

Democratic Party members of the Washington House of Representatives
1879 births
1976 deaths
People from Pomeroy, Washington